Calosoma retusum is a beetle of the family Carabidae.

Description
This species usually has a bright metallic dark green or bronze green coloration, sometime with bluish reflections. The borders of the pronotum are rounded and raised. Elytra are striated, with large punctures. These beetles are voracious consumer of caterpillars, so they are considered beneficial insects for the agriculture.

Distribution
This species occurs in southern Brazil, Uruguay, Argentina, Bolivia and Perù.

References

Meloidae

retusum
Beetles described in 1775
Taxa named by Johan Christian Fabricius
Beetles of South America